Koven is a surname. Notable people with the surname include:

Anna de Koven (1862–1953), American novelist, historian and socialite
Ernest de Koven Leffingwell (1875–1971), arctic explorer, geologist and Spanish–American War veteran
Henry William John Koven, connected with SS Sauternes, a steamship built in 1922
James De Koven, also known as James DeKoven, (1831–1879), priest, an educator and leader of the Oxford Movement in the Episcopal Church
Jamie Koven (born 1973), American rower
Jean de Koven (1915–1937), dancer from Boston, Massachusetts, who was murdered in Paris, France in 1937
Reginald De Koven (1859–1920), American music critic and prolific composer, particularly of comic operas
Steve Koven, Canadian jazz pianist and member of the Steve Koven Trio

Koven may also refer to:

Music
 Koven (group), a British drum and bass duo formed in 2011

See also

Covens
Govend
Kofein
Kovanj
Kovend
Kövend